Ajita Wilson (January 12, 1950 – May 26, 1987) was an American transgender  actress who starred in European exploitation and hardcore films in the 1970s and 1980s.

Biography 
Wilson was born in Brooklyn a biological male. She started out as a drag entertainer in the red-light district of New York. Wilson had sex reassignment surgery in the mid-1970s. She also did some fashion modeling work. Wilson died from a brain hemorrhage on May 26, 1987, at age 37.

Partial filmography

The Nude Princess (1976) - Princess Mariam
Gola profonda nera (1977) - Claudine
Sylvia im Reich der Wollust (1977) - Cula Caballé
La sorprendente eredità del tontodimammà (1977)
Mavri Aphroditi (English titles: Black Aphrodite and Blue Passion) (1977) - Tamara
La bravata (1977) - Jeanette
D'improvviso al terzo piano (1977)
Amori morbosi di una contessina (1977)
L'amour chez les poids lourds (English title: Truck Stop) (1978) - Calypso (uncredited)
Follie Di Notte aka Joe D'Amato – Follie Di Notte (1978) - Sex Show Performer
Le notti porno nel mondo nº 2 (English title: Scandinavian Erotica) (1978) - Stewardess
Proibito erotico (English title: Erotic Fantasies) (1978) - Julie
Adolescenza morbosa (1978)
Bactron 317 ou L'espionne qui venait du show (1979) - Barbara
Una donna di notte (1979)
Pensione amore - SerVizio completo (1979) - Karina
Libidine (1979) - Mary
Los Energéticos (1979) - Carla
Eros Perversion (1979) - Antonia
Escape from Hell (1980) - Zaira
The Smugglers (1980) - Luisa
Orinoco: Prigioniere del sesso (1980) - Muriel
Eva man (Due sessi in uno) (1980) - Ajita
Pensieri Morbosi (English title: Deep Thoughts) (1980) - Prostitute
Sadomania (1981) - Magda Hurtado / Man Having Sex with Lucas
Pasiones desenfrenadas (1981) - Enrica
Erotiki ekstasi (1981) - Sara
Erotiko pathos (1981) - Samantha
Apocalipsis sexual (1982) - Liza
Bacanales romanas (1982) - Venus de Ébano
Catherine Chérie (1982) - Ajita
 (1982) - Monika
El regreso de Eva Man (1982) - Ajita
Orgia stin Kerkyra (English Title: The Pussycat Syndrome) (1983) - Donna Washington
Macumba sexual (1983) - Princesa Obongo
La doppia bocca di Erika (1983) - Erika
Corpi nudi (1983)
Anomaloi erotes sti santorini (1983)
Perverse oltre le sbarre (1984) - Conchita
Detenute violente (1984) - Eureka Thompson
To mikrofono tis Alikis (1984)
 (1984)
Stin Athina simera... oles ton pernoun fanera! (1984)
Kai to proto pinelo (1984)
Idones sto Aigaio (1984) - Ajita
Savage Island (1985) - Marla (archive footage)
Bocca Bianca Bocca Nera (1986) - Ramona
Diakopes Stin Idra (English Title: Holidays in Hydra) (1986) - (final film role)

References

External links

Created By Cinema: The Enigma of Ajita Wilson (The Grindhouse Effect)

1950 births
1987 deaths
African-American actresses
American film actresses
LGBT African Americans
20th-century American actresses
Transgender actresses
Transgender female models
20th-century African-American women
20th-century American LGBT people